Louis Josephus Maria van de Laar (24 December 1921 – 25 January 2004) was a Dutch politician of the defunct Catholic People's Party (KVP) now merged into the Christian Democratic Appeal (CDA) and historian.

Education 
In 1939, he started studying at the Radboud University Nijmegen, where he obtained master's degrees in history and economics in 1947. He continued his studies in history from 1945 to 1946 at the Sorbonne and École pratique des hautes études (Paris).

Career 
After finishing his studies, van de Laar became a history teacher and then rector at several secondary schools. From 1963 to 1965, he was state secretary at the Ministry of Education, Culture, and Science in the Marijnen cabinet for the Catholic People's Party. Through this function, he became one of the founders of the Dutch Language Union.

In October 1965, he became mayor of Bergen op Zoom, where he remained until his retirement in 1981.

Awards 
Van de Laar received the following awards:
 Knight in the Order of the Netherlands Lion
 Grand Officer in the Order of Orange-Nassau
 Knight in the Order of St. Gregory the Great
 Krijgt de Taalunieprijs

References

External links

Official
  Drs. L.J.M. (Louis) van de Laar Parlement & Politiek

1921 births
2004 deaths
Catholic People's Party politicians
Christian Democratic Appeal politicians
Dutch critics
Dutch education writers
20th-century Dutch historians
Dutch music educators
Dutch Roman Catholics
Grand Officers of the Order of Orange-Nassau
Knights of the Order of the Netherlands Lion
Knights of St. Gregory the Great
Mayors of Bergen op Zoom
People from 's-Hertogenbosch
Radboud University Nijmegen alumni
State Secretaries for Education of the Netherlands
20th-century Dutch educators
20th-century Dutch male writers
20th-century Dutch politicians